Bazoft Rural District was in Bazoft District of Kuhrang County, Chaharmahal and Bakhtiari province, Iran. At the census of 2006, its population was 8,526 in 1,441 households. It consisted of 64 villages, of which Cham Qaleh was the largest, with 891 people. The rural district did not appear in the following two censuses.

References 

Kuhrang County

Rural Districts of Chaharmahal and Bakhtiari Province

Populated places in Chaharmahal and Bakhtiari Province

Populated places in Kuhrang County